The Oberhessische Presse is a regional, daily newspaper published by the Hitzeroth Druck + Medien GmbH & Co. KG for the district of Marburg-Biedenkopf in Hesse, Germany.

The newspaper was created in 1951 by the merger of the Oberhessische Zeitung and the Marburger Presse.

References

External links 
  

Marburg-Biedenkopf
Daily newspapers published in Germany
German-language newspapers
Publications established in 1951